Barrow of the Forgotten King is an adventure module for the 3.5 edition of the Dungeons & Dragons fantasy role-playing game.

Plot summary
Barrow of the Forgotten King features wolves prowling the graveyard of Kingsholm, where something has disturbed the rest of those buried in the mausoleum. The player characters must explore the catacombs beneath the graves to discover what evils stirs in the depths.

Publication history
Barrow of the Forgotten King was written by Ed Stark, and was published in February 2007. Cover art was by Steve Prescott, with interior art by Wayne England and Joel Thomas.

Reception

References

Dungeons & Dragons modules
Role-playing game supplements introduced in 2006